The fission-fragment rocket is a rocket engine design that directly harnesses hot nuclear fission products for thrust, as opposed to using a separate fluid as working mass. The design can, in theory, produce very high specific impulse while still being well within the abilities of current technologies.

Design considerations 

In traditional nuclear thermal rocket and related designs, the nuclear energy is generated in some form of reactor and used to heat a working fluid to generate thrust. This limits the designs to temperatures that allow the reactor to remain whole, although clever design can increase this critical temperature into the tens of thousands of degrees. A rocket engine's efficiency is strongly related to the temperature of the exhausted working fluid, and in the case of the most advanced gas-core engines, it corresponds to a specific impulse of about 7000 s Isp.

The temperature of a conventional reactor design is the average temperature of the fuel, the vast majority of which is not reacting at any given instant. The atoms undergoing fission are at a temperature of millions of degrees, which is then spread out into the surrounding fuel, resulting in an overall temperature of a few thousand. 

By physically arranging the fuel into very thin layers or particles, the fragments of a nuclear reaction can escape from the surface. Since they will be ionized due to the high energy of the reaction, they can then be handled magnetically and channeled to produce thrust.  Numerous technological challenges still remain, however.

Research

Rotating fuel reactor

A design by the Idaho National Engineering Laboratory and Lawrence Livermore National Laboratory  uses fuel placed on the surface of a number of very thin carbon fibres, arranged radially in wheels. The wheels are normally sub-critical. Several such wheels were stacked on a common shaft to produce a single large cylinder. The entire cylinder was rotated so that some fibres were always in a reactor core where surrounding moderator made fibres go critical. The fission fragments at the surface of the fibres would break free and be channeled for thrust. The fibre then rotates out of the reaction zone, to cool, to avoid melting.

The efficiency of the system is surprising; specific impulses of greater than 100,000s are possible using existing materials. This is high performance, although the weight of the reactor core and other elements would make the overall performance of the fission-fragment system lower. Nonetheless, the system provides the sort of performance levels that would make an interstellar precursor mission possible.

Dusty plasma

A newer design proposal by Rodney L. Clark and Robert B. Sheldon theoretically increases efficiency and decreases complexity of a fission fragment rocket at the same time over the rotating fibre wheel proposal.  In their design, nanoparticles of fissionable fuel (or even fuel that will naturally radioactively decay) are kept in a vacuum chamber subject to an axial magnetic field (acting as a magnetic mirror) and an external electric field.  As the nanoparticles ionize as fission occurs, the dust becomes suspended within the chamber. The incredibly high surface area of the particles makes radiative cooling simple. The axial magnetic field is too weak to affect the motions of the dust particles but strong enough to channel the fragments into a beam which can be decelerated for power, allowed to be emitted for thrust, or a combination of the two. With exhaust velocities of 3% - 5% the speed of light and efficiencies up to 90%, the rocket should be able to achieve over 1,000,000 sec Isp.

Am 242m as nuclear fuel

In 1987 Ronen & Leibson  published a study on applications of 242mAm (one of the isotopes of americium) as nuclear fuel to space nuclear reactors, noting its extremely high thermal cross section and energy density. Nuclear systems powered by 242mAm require less fuel by a factor of 2 to 100 compared to conventional nuclear fuels.  

Fission-fragment rocket using 242mAm was proposed by George Chapline at LLNL in 1988, who suggested propulsion based on the direct heating of a propellant gas by fission fragments generated by a fissile material. Ronen et al. demonstrate that 242mAm can maintain sustained nuclear fission as an extremely thin metallic film, less than 1/1000 of a millimeter thick. 242mAm requires only 1% of the mass of 235U or 239Pu to reach its critical state. Ronen's group at Ben-Gurion University of the Negev further showed that nuclear fuel based on 242mAm could speed space vehicles from Earth to Mars in as little as two weeks. 

242mAm's potential as a nuclear fuel derives from the fact that it has the highest thermal fission cross section (thousands of barns), about 10x  the next highest cross section across all known isotopes.
242mAm is fissile (because it has an odd number of neutrons) and has a low critical mass, comparable to that of 239Pu. 
It has a very high cross section for fission, and is destroyed relatively quickly in a nuclear reactor. Another report claims that 242mAm can sustain a chain reaction even as a thin film, and could be used for a novel type of nuclear rocket. 

Since the thermal absorption cross section of 242mAm is very high, the best way to obtain 242mAm is by the capture of fast or epithermal neutrons in Americium-241 irradiated in a fast reactor. However, fast spectrum reactors are not readily available. Detailed analysis of 242mAm production in existing PWRs was provided in. Proliferation resistance of 242mAm was reported by Karlsruhe Institute of Technology 2008 study. 

In 2000 Carlo Rubbia at CERN further extended the work by Ronen  and Chapline on fission-fragment rocket using 242mAm as a fuel. Project 242 based on Rubbia design studied a concept of 242mAm based Thin-Film Fission Fragment Heated NTR by using direct conversion of the kinetic energy of fission fragments into increasing of enthalpy of a propellant gas. Project 242 studied the application of this propulsion system to a crewed mission to Mars. Preliminary results were very satisfactory and it has been observed that a propulsion system with these characteristics could make the mission feasible. Another study focused on production of 242mAm in conventional thermal nuclear reactors.

See also 
 Fission fragment reactor
 Pulsed nuclear thermal rocket
 Nuclear salt-water rocket

References 

Americium
Nuclear spacecraft propulsion